Every Time I Feel the Spirit is a 1959 studio album by Nat King Cole, of spirituals, arranged by Gordon Jenkins. Cole is accompanied by the First Church of Deliverance Choir of Chicago, Illinois.  The album was re-issued by Capitol Records in 1966 under the new title, Nat King Cole Sings Hymns and Spirituals.  Several bonus tracks, recorded between 1951 and 1961 and arranged by Nelson Riddle and others, were added to later CD re-issues.

Track listing
 "Every Time I Feel the Spirit" – 1:49
 "I Want to Be Ready" – 1:47
 "Sweet Hour of Prayer" – 1:50
 "Ain't Gonna Study War No More" – 2:39
 "I Found the Answer" (Johnny Lange) – 2:00
 "Standin' in the Need of Prayer" – 2:13
 "Oh, Mary, Don't You Weep" (Nat "King" Cole, Gordon Jenkins) – 1:58
 "Go Down Moses" – 1:51
 "Nobody Knows the Trouble I've Seen" – 2:46
 "In the Sweet By and By" (S. Fillmore Bennett, Joseph P. Webster) – 1:55
 "I Couldn't Hear Nobody Pray" – 1:54
 "Steal Away" – 2:49
Bonus tracks added to later re-issues:
 "The First Baseball Game" (Gene de Paul, Don Raye) – 2:30
 "This Holy Love" (Haven Gillespie, Larry Shay) – 3:05
 "Peace of Mind" (Gus Kahn) – 2:56
 "Easter Sunday Morning" (Cole, Ervin Drake, Jimmy Shirl) – 3:02
 "Believe" (Moose Charlap, Paul O'Neil) – 2:23
 "The Lighthouse in the Sky" (Hal David, Morty Nevins) – 2:37

All songs are traditional Negro spirituals, other composers indicated.

Personnel

Performance
 Nat King Cole – vocal
 The First Church of Deliverance Choir
 Gordon Jenkins – arranger, conductor

References

Capitol Records W 1249 Every Time I Feel the Spirit at  discogs.com
 ...at LP discography.com
 ...at apileocole.com
Every Time I Feel the Spirit (2007 CD re-issue) at discogs.com
Nat King Cole Sings Hymns and Spirituals (1966 re-issue of Every Time I Feel the Spirit) at discogs.com

Nat King Cole albums
Albums arranged by Gordon Jenkins
Capitol Records albums
1959 albums
Gospel albums by American artists
Albums conducted by Gordon Jenkins